Filipe Bezugo (born 10 November 1980) is a Portuguese gymnast. He competed at the 2004 Summer Olympics.

References

External links
 

1980 births
Living people
Portuguese male artistic gymnasts
Olympic gymnasts of Portugal
Gymnasts at the 2004 Summer Olympics
Sportspeople from Funchal
21st-century Portuguese people